Fox Maule-Ramsay, 11th Earl of Dalhousie,  (22 April 18016 July 1874), known as Fox Maule before 1852, as The Lord Panmure between 1852 and 1860, was a British politician.

Ancestry

Dalhousie was the eldest son of William Maule, 1st Baron Panmure, and a grandson of George Ramsay, 8th Earl of Dalhousie. Christened Fox as a compliment to Charles James Fox, the great Whig, he served for a term in the Army.

Early life and career
Fox Maule was born in Brechin Castle, on 22 April 1801. He was educated at the Charter House, London. In 1819 he received his commission as ensign in the 79th Regiment of Cameron Highlanders.

For some years he served in Canada on the staff of his uncle, the Earl of Dalhousie. In 1831, having attained to the rank of captain, he retired from the army, and having married the Hon. Montagu, daughter of the second Lord Abercrombie, he took up his residence at Dalguise House, on the 
banks of the Tay, near Dunkeld. This was his home for twenty years.

Fox Maule campaigned during the first election for Perthshire, canvassing in favour of his friend, the Marquis of Breadalbane, then Lord Ormelie.  As he afterwards said, "I was politically born then." At the next election, in 1834, he was returned as member for Perthshire. Having lost his seat at the next election, he was returned for the Elgin Burghs. Having resigned his seat for the Elgin Burghs, he was elected by the city of Perth, which he continued to represent for ten years, until he was called to the House of Lords after his father's death.

Political career

In 1835 he entered the House of Commons as member for Perthshire. In the ministry of Lord Melbourne (1835–1841), Maule was Under-Secretary of State for the Home Department, and under Lord John Russell, he was Secretary at War from July 1846 to January 1852, when for two or three weeks he was President of the Board of Control.

In April 1852, he succeeded his father as 2nd Baron Panmure. In February 1855, he joined Lord Palmerston's cabinet, filling the new office of Secretary of State for War. Lord Panmure held this office until February 1858. He was at the War Office during the concluding period of the Crimean War, and met a good deal of criticism. He was Keeper of the Privy Seal of Scotland from 1853 until his death.

Always interested in church matters, Dalhousie was a prominent supporter of the Free Church of Scotland after it split from the Church of Scotland in the disruption of 1843. In December 1860, he succeeded his kinsman, the 1st Marquess of Dalhousie, as 11th Earl of Dalhousie. He shortly afterwards changed his surname to "Maule-Ramsay" (his father had changed his surname to "Maule" from the family's patronymic "Ramsay" before being created Baron Panmure).

Death and legacy

Free Church elder
For  thirty  years  he  was  returned  by  the  Free  Presbytery  of  Dunkeld  as  their  representative  elder  to  the  General  Assembly,  and  took  an  active  part  in  its  proceedings.  After  the  Disruption, when  so  many  proprietors  refused  sites  for  the  building  of  churches  and  manses,  it  was  mainly  through  his  speeches  in  Parliament  that  the  difficulty  was  surmounted. He laid the foundation stone for the new Free Church at Dunkeld.

Freemasonry 
Maule was appointed Senior Grand Warden of the United Grand Lodge of England in 1832, and later (as Lord Panmure) Deputy Grand Master in 1857. He was elected Grand Master of the Grand Lodge of Scotland in 1867. In 1860, Panmure Lodge (now No. 723) was warranted, being named after the then Deputy Grand Master.

Marriage
Lord Dalhousie married the Hon. Montague, daughter of George Abercromby, 2nd Baron Abercromby, in 1831. They had no children. She died in November 1853, aged 46. Lord Dalhousie died July 1874, aged 73. On his death, the barony of Panmure became extinct, but the earldom of Dalhousie (and its subsidiary titles) passed to his cousin, George Ramsay.

References

Citations

Sources

External links

Dalhousie, Fox Maule Ramsay, 11th Earl
Maule, Fox
Maule, Fox
Maule, Fox
Maule, Fox
Dalhousie, E11
Maule, Fox
Dalhousie, Fox Maule-Ramsay, 11th Earl of
Dalhousie
Eldest sons of British hereditary barons
Dalhousie, Fox Maule Ramsay, 11th Earl of
Dalhousie, Fox Maule Ramsay, 11th Earl of
Dalhousie, Fox Maule Ramsay, 11th Earl
Dalhousie, Fox Maule Ramsay, 11th Earl of
Dalhousie, Fox Maule Ramsay, 11th Earl
Dalhousie, Fox Maule Ramsay, 11th Earl
Fox
Free Church of Scotland people
Presidents of the Board of Control